The Swiss Journal of Psychology is a peer-reviewed academic journal and the official journal of the Swiss Society of Psychology. It was established in 1942 as the Schweizerische Zeitschrift für Psychologie with Jean Piaget as founding editor-in-chief. It covers all aspects of psychology and publishes articles in English, German, or French.

Abstracting and indexing 
The journal is abstracted and indexed in:

According to the Journal Citation Reports, the journal has a 2012 impact factor of 0.638.

References

External links 
 

Multilingual journals
Psychology journals
Quarterly journals
Publications established in 1942
1942 establishments in Switzerland
English-language journals
German-language journals
French-language journals
Academic journals associated with learned and professional societies